Joseph C. Spero is currently the Chief U.S. Magistrate Judge of the United States District Court for the Northern District of California.

Education
Judge Spero received his Bachelor of Arts degree from Grinnell College in 1977, and his Juris Doctor degree from Columbia Law School in 1981.

Career
Upon graduating from law school, Judge Spero clerked for the U.S. Court of Appeals for the Ninth Circuit. He then joined the law firm of Skadden, Arps, Slate, Meagher & Flom as an Associate in 1982, and then worked at the firm of Coblentz, Cahen, McCabe & Breyer (now Coblentz, Patch, Duffy & Bass) in 1984, where he became Partner in 1989. While in private practice, Judge Spero also served as a Judge Pro Tem for the San Francisco Superior Court and underwent mediation training at Harvard Law School and served as a mediator for the Northern District of California's Alternative Dispute Resolution Program. He has also served as pro bono counsel in various cases.

Judicial Service
On March 13, 1999, Judge Spero was appointed as a U.S. Magistrate Judge for the Northern District of California.

In 2015, Judge Spero was appointed Chief Magistrate Judge.

Judge Spero serves on the Northern District of California's Executive Committee, as Chair of the Northern District of California's Reentry Committee and of the Diversion Committee, has previously served as Chair of the Northern District of California’s Technology Committee, and has served as Liaison Judge for Pretrial Services and Probation in the Northern District of California as well. He has also served on various circuit and national committees including the Magistrate Judges Advisory Group of the Administrative Office of the United States Courts, the Magistrate Judge Executive Board, and the Capital Case Committee of the U.S. Court of Appeals for the Ninth Circuit.

Accolades
Judge Spero has received the Thurgood Marshall Award from the Bar Association of the City of New York.

See also
United States District Court for the Northern District of California
United States Court of Appeals for the Ninth Circuit

External links
The Honorable Joseph C. Spero, Chief U.S. Magistrate Judge, United States District Court for the Northern District of California
Ballotpedia: Judge Joseph Spero
Judicial Profile: Judge Joseph Spero (Law.com)

References

Living people
American lawyers
Grinnell College alumni
United States magistrate judges
People from San Francisco
21st-century American judges
Columbia Law School alumni
Year of birth missing (living people)